Jana Šišajová (born February 1, 1985 in Kežmarok) is a Slovakian luger who has competed since 2000. Competing in two Winter Olympics, she earned her best finish of 22nd in the women's singles event at Turin in 2006.

Šišajová best finish at the FIL World Luge Championships was 24th in the women's singles event at Lake Placid, New York in 2009. Her best finish at the FIL European Luge Championships was 16th in the women's singles event at Cesana in 2008.

References
 2006 luge women's singles results (todor66.com)
 FIL-Luge profile
 The-Sports.org profile

External links 
 
 
 

1985 births
Living people
Slovak female lugers
Olympic lugers of Slovakia
Lugers at the 2006 Winter Olympics
Lugers at the 2010 Winter Olympics
People from Kežmarok
Sportspeople from the Prešov Region